In quantum computing, the quantum phase estimation algorithm (also referred to as quantum eigenvalue estimation algorithm), is a quantum algorithm to estimate the phase (or eigenvalue) of an eigenvector of a unitary operator. The algorithm was initially introduced by Alexei Kitaev in 1995.

Phase estimation is frequently used as a subroutine in other quantum algorithms, such as Shor's algorithm and the quantum algorithm for linear systems of equations.

The problem
Let U be a unitary operator that operates on m  qubits with an  eigenvector  such that .

We can write the eigenvalue in the form  because U is a unitary operator over a complex vector space, so its eigenvalues must be complex numbers with absolute value 1.

The algorithm

Setup
The input consists of two  registers  (namely, two parts): the upper  qubits comprise the first register, and the lower  qubits are the second register.

Create superposition 
The initial state of the system is:

After applying n-bit  Hadamard gate operation  on the first register, the state becomes:
.

Apply controlled unitary operations 
Let  be a unitary operator with eigenvector  such that  thus by exponentiation by squaring, 

.

Assuming for the sake of clarity that the controlled gates are applied sequentially, after applying to the  qubit of the first register and the second register, the state becomes

where we use:

Apply inverse quantum Fourier transform 
Applying inverse quantum Fourier transform on 

 

yields 

The state of both registers together is

Phase approximation representation 

We can now write the state of the first and second register in the following way:

Measurement 
Performing a  measurement  in the computational basis on the first register yields the result  with probability

For  the approximation is precise, thus  and  In this case, we always measure the accurate value of the phase.

For  since  the algorithm yields the correct result with probability . We prove this as follows:

Examples 
Consider the simplest possible instance of the algorithm, where only  qubit, on top of the qubits required to encode , is involved. Suppose the eigenvalue of  reads . The first part of the algorithm generates the one-qubit state . Applying the inverse QFT amounts in this case to applying a Pauli-X gate. The final outcome probabilities are thus  where , or more explicitly,It is clear that in this simple example, if , then  and thus we deterministically recover the precise eigenvalue from the measurement outcome.

This is compatible with our general discussion because .

See also 
 Shor's algorithm
  Quantum counting algorithm
 Parity measurement

References

Quantum algorithms